Andreas Schleicher (born 7 July 1964) is a German mathematician, statistician and researcher in the field of education who is currently the director for education and skills, and special adviser on education policy to the secretary-general, at the Organisation for Economic Co-operation and Development (OECD) in Paris.

Education
When Schleicher was 10, his father removed him from the state school system and sent him to the Rudolf Steiner School Waldorf in Wandsbek, Hamburg, where he achieved an average of 1.0, the top mark possible, for his school leaving certificate. He studied physics in Hamburg and then mathematics at Deakin University, where he graduated with a Master of Science degree in 1992. In 2006, the University of Heidelberg named him an Honorary Professor in the Faculty of Behavioral and Cultural Studies.

Career
Schleicher is the director for education and skills, and special adviser on education policy to the secretary-general, at the Organisation for Economic Co-operation and Development (OECD) in Paris.

As a key member of the OECD senior management team, Schleicher supports the secretary-general's strategy to produce analysis and policy advice that advances economic growth and social progress.

He also promotes the work of the directorate for education and skills on a global stage.

In addition to policy and country reviews, the work of the directorate includes the Programme for International Student Assessment, the OECD Survey of Adult Skills, the OECD Teaching and Learning International Survey and the development and analysis of benchmarks on the performance of education systems.

Before joining the OECD, Schleicher was director for analysis at the International Association for Educational Achievement.

He later joined the Royal Swedish Academy of Engineering Sciences (IVA) as an international fellow in 2020.

Other activities
 Stiftung Lesen, Member of the Board of Trustees

Recognition
Schleicher is the recipient of numerous honours and awards, including the "Theodor Heuss" prize, awarded in the name of the first president of the Federal Republic of Germany for "exemplary democratic engagement".

Personal life
A German citizen, Schleicher is married, with three children. He speaks German, English, Italian and French.

References

External links
 
 Past Winners of Harold W. McGraw, Jr. Prize in Education

German statisticians
People from Wandsbek
1964 births
Living people
20th-century German mathematicians
21st-century German mathematicians